Telphusa incognitella is a moth of the family Gelechiidae. It is found in Japan, Korea and the Russian Far East.

The wingspan is 12–15 mm. The forewings are snow white with black markings.

References

Moths described in 1892
Telphusa